Yairus Gwijangge (31 December 1968 – 15 November 2020) was an Indonesian politician who served as Regent of Nduga from 30 September 2011 to his death on 15 November 2020 in two consecutive terms. He was the first regent of Nduga. He died in Jakarta.

References 

1968 births
2020 deaths
Papuan people
Indonesian politicians